Wired For Sex is a television program on the former TechTV network showcasing how technology and the Internet have affected sex, including topics ranging from pornography to cyber sex. It was cancelled shortly before TechTV was bought by G4 Media in May 2004 and merged with G4 to form G4techTV. G4 contacted World of Wonder Productions, who originally produced Wired for Sex for TechTV, and ordered an entirely new season. The series ended in 2008.

External links
Detailed Information - http://worldofwonder.net/productions/wired-for-sex/

TechTV original programming